Anholt is a town and former city in the municipality of Isselburg, Kreis Borken in the German State of North Rhine-Westphalia. It was the residence of the Lords of Anholt. It is the capital of the Principality of Salm-Salm, a former noble family still residing at Anholt Castle.

Anholt borders on the Netherlands to the north and west, on the Rhineland to the south and is the outermost western town of the district of Münster, Westphalia.

Villages in North Rhine-Westphalia